The Cholas did not have a standing navy in the modern sense. The maritime force of Cholas was formed by using ships used for trade, as they did not have a dedicated ship for naval combat. The ships were used for transporting the land army overseas.

The Cholas were at the height of their power from the latter half of the 9th century CE through the early 13th century CE. Between 1010 and 1153 CE, Rajaraja's successors continued the expansion, making the Chola Empire a military, economic and cultural power in South and South-East Asia. During this period, the Chola Navy helped expand the empire with Naval expeditions to the Pala of Pataliputra, along the Ganges and the Chola invasion of Srivijaya (present-day Indonesia) in 1025 CE, as well as repeated embassies to China. The Chola Navy declined in the 13th century when the Cholas fought land battles with the Chalukyas of Andhra-Kannada area in South India, and with the rise of the Pandyan dynasty.

History

Imperial Chola period (848–1070 CE)

Rajaraja I and Rajendra I

Under Rajaraja Chola I and his son Rajendra Chola I, the dynasty became a military, economic and cultural power in Asia. Rajaraja Chola conquered peninsular South India, annexed parts of Sri Lanka and occupied the islands of the northernmost atolls of the Maldives. Rajendra Chola sent a victorious expedition to North India that touched the river Ganges and defeated the Pala ruler of Pataliputra, Mahipala. He also raided kingdoms of Maritime Southeast Asia.

An inscription from Sirkazhi, dated to 1187 CE, mentions a naval officer called Araiyan Kadalkolamitantaan alias Amarakon Pallavaraiyan. He is mentioned as the Tandalnayagam of the Karaippadaiyilaar. The term Karaippadaiyilaar means "forces or army of the seashore" and the title Tandalnayagam is similar to Dandanayaka and means "commander of the forces". The title Kadalkolamitantaan means "one who floated while the sea was engulfed".

Trade, commerce, and diplomacy
The Cholas excelled in foreign trade and maritime activity, extending their influence overseas to China and Southeast Asia. A fragmentary Tamil inscription found in Sumatra cites the name of a merchant guild Nanadesa Tisaiyayirattu Ainnutruvar (literally, "the five hundred from the four countries and the thousand directions"), a famous merchant guild in the Chola country. The inscription is dated 1088, indicating that there was an active overseas trade during the Chola period.

Towards the end of the 9th century, southern India had developed extensive maritime and commercial activity, especially with the Chinese and Arabs. The Cholas, being in possession of parts of both the west and the east coasts of peninsular India, were at the forefront of these ventures. The Tang dynasty of China, the Srivijaya empire in the Malayan archipelago under the Sailendras, and the Abbasid caliphate at Baghdad were the main trading partners.

Cooperation with the Chinese
Chinese Song Dynasty reports record that an embassy from Chulian (Chola) reached the Chinese court in the year 1077, and that the king of the Chulien at the time was called Ti-hua-kia-lo. It is possible that these syllables denote "Deva Kulo[tunga]" (Kulothunga Chola I). This embassy was a trading venture and was highly profitable to the visitors, who returned with "81,800 strings of copper coins in exchange for articles of tributes, including glass articles, and spices".

Vessels and weapons

Very little information about Chola ships has survived. Because of this, the technique used for naval battles and how the battles were fought is unknown. R.C. Majumdar argues that the naval battles fought by Chola are basically land battles fought on ships, and the ships used were transports used for transporting the army. It is also possible that the Cholas did not fight naval battles—the battles were fought on land. Despite their maritime connection, the Cholas left no traces of maritime or ship-related iconography, unlike the earlier Sathavahanas, Salankayanas, Kurumbas, and Pallavas.

Rajendra Chola's inscriptions mentioned the term kalam, which is a usual term for a ship. Tamil inscription of 1088 from Barus, Sumatra, dated 1088 CE mentioned marakkalam (timber ship). The size of the ship and where it was constructed are unknown. A Tamil inscription of about 1200/1256 CE from Krishnapattinam, on the Andhra coast, mentioned several sea vessels: There are marakkalam, toni, kalavam, vedi, and padavu. Their size is not recorded, Y. Subbarayalu thinks that the marakkalam may have been the biggest since it was mentioned first, and it may be about 4 times bigger than padavu since it was charged 4 times the charge on padavu. The toni (also pronounced as dhony) was charged the same amount as marakkalam, but according to Subbarayalu they may be smaller than marakkalam in size. The dhony continued operating in the 19th century, plying the routes between Sri Lanka and Madras (Chennai).

Campaigns
Chola military campaigns late 10th and early 11th centuries were in fact plundering raids. This is done to ensure the entry of spoils, which can be in the form of livestock, jewelry, and other forms of property.

See also
 Chola dynasty
 Chola military
 Dravidian architecture

Notes

References

Navy
Military of Chola
History of Thanjavur
Military history of Southeast Asia
Naval history of India
Disbanded navies